The 21st Golden Raspberry Awards were held on March 24, 2001, at the Radisson-Huntley Hotel in Santa Monica, California, USA, to recognize the worst the movie industry had to offer in 2000.

Science fiction bomb Battlefield Earth swept the awards, claiming victory in all seven categories in which it was nominated (from a total of eight nominations, with its double nomination in the Supporting Actor category). J.D. Shapiro later accepted his Worst Screenplay award in a radio program. The record is then beaten by Jack and Jill (with the total of 12 nominations and 10 wins).

Awards and nominations

Films with multiple nominations 
These films received multiple nominations:

See also

2000 in film
73rd Academy Awards
54th British Academy Film Awards
58th Golden Globe Awards
27th Saturn Awards
7th Screen Actors Guild Awards

References

Golden Raspberry Awards
Golden Raspberry Awards ceremonies
2001 in American cinema
2001 in California
March 2001 events in the United States
Golden Raspberry